Eric Kamdem Kamdem  (February 24, 1983 - 8 August 2009) was a Cameroonian footballer.

Early life
Kamdem was born in Buea and raised in Yaoundé. He has two siblings his brother worked in the Italian city of Cagliari and his sister has studied in Monaco.

Career
He played professionally in the Belarusian Premier League for Dinamo Minsk and Gomel. He was member of the Russian First Division team Anzhi Makhachkala and the Ukrainian club FC Illychivets Mariupol.

Death
Kamdem died on Saturday 8 August 2009 in a car accident during his summer vacation with his wife in Ayos, Cameroon.

References

1983 births
2009 deaths
Cameroonian footballers
Association football midfielders
Cameroonian expatriate footballers
Expatriate footballers in Thailand
Expatriate footballers in Cyprus
Expatriate footballers in Russia
Expatriate footballers in Belarus
Expatriate footballers in Ukraine
Cameroonian expatriate sportspeople in Ukraine
Cameroonian expatriate sportspeople in Thailand
Ukrainian Premier League players
Les Astres players
Eric Kamdem Kamdem
APEP FC players
Fovu Baham players
FC Anzhi Makhachkala players
FC Dinamo Minsk players
FC Gomel players
FC Mariupol players
Road incident deaths in Cameroon